Luca Postiglione (October 18, 1876 in Naples – 1936) was an Italian painter, mainly of portraits, and historic and genre subjects, in a Realist style.

He was the son of the painter Luigi Postiglione. His elder brother, Salvatore Postiglione was also a painter and his teacher. Luigi's uncle, Raffaele (1818–1897) was a professor at the Neapolitan Institute of Fine Arts.

Among his works are L'orfana exhibited at the Italian Exhibition in London in 1904, while Il giglio, and La Soglia were exhibited at the International Exposition in Rome in 1906.

References

19th-century Italian painters
Italian male painters
20th-century Italian painters
1876 births
1936 deaths
Painters from Naples
19th-century Italian male artists
20th-century Italian male artists